Andrew Musuva (born January 9, 1970) is a Kenyan long distance runner and three-time winner of the Twin Cities Marathon.

Running career
Andrew Musuva began running at the age of 20, and he grew up playing soccer. His first marathon was the Pittsburgh Marathon in 1994. In 1999, a bout of malaria forced Musuva to quit in the middle of the 2000 Grandma's Marathon. The illness may have also hindered his success in the 2000 Twin Cities Marathon, where he finished in 10th place.

Musuva's most noteworthy achievement in long-distance running is winning the Twin Cities Marathon for three consecutive years. 1997 was the first year that Musuva won the $20,000 first place purse in the Twin Cities Marathon. Musuva performed well in 1998 and was projected to win the Twin Cities Marathon for a second time. In 1999, Andrew Musuva became the first man to win the Twin Cities Marathon three times in a row. Andrew Musuva has made over $150,000 during his running career.

In an Outside (magazine) story, Musuva chased down an antelope with a team of runners to test the concept of human persistence hunting.

Early and personal life
Andrew Musuva was born in Mitaboni, Kenya. He is the oldest of 8 children, and his father works as a school principal. Musuva lives in Farmington, Minnesota, and coaches a soccer team for children under the age of 10.

Achievements

References

External links 

1970 births
Living people
Kenyan male long-distance runners